I Am the Law may refer to:

 I Am the Law (1922 film), starring Alice Lake and Kenneth Harlan
 I Am the Law (1938 film), starring Edward G. Robinson
 I'm the Law, 1952 syndicated TV series starring George Raft
 "I am the law!", frequently-used expression by fictional comic book character Judge Dredd
 "I Am the Law", 1981 song by The Human League written about this character which features on the album Dare
 "I Am the Law", 1987 song by Anthrax written about this character which features on the album Among the Living